Princewill Emeka Olariche (born 24 May 1992) is a Nigerian professional footballer who plays as a forward. He last played for Kickstart.

Club career

Nigeria
In 2013, Nigerian top-tier club Heartland FC scouted Princewill and offered him to play for reserve team. After spending a season with Heartland he then moved to Abuja-based team, Vin Sports FC in Nigeria. After another season he decided to move to Asia to secure a better deal in his football career.

NEROCA FC
In January 2016, Princewill came to India to secure a better deal and tried his luck in Manipur based club NEROCA FC. On 2 February 2016, NEROCA FC and Princewill signed an agreement for 1 season. He played final round of 2015–16 I-League 2nd Division and Manipur Super League with NEROCA.

TRAU FC
For season 2017-18 he moved to rivals of NEROCA FC in Manipur state league, TRAU FC. He has represented TRAU in 2017–18 I-League 2nd Division with impressive performance scoring 7 goals under his belt.

Mohammedan Sporting
In 2019, while playing in the 2nd Division I-League he was scouted to Kolkata based club Mohammedan Sporting. Mohammedan Sporting gave him offer for Calcutta Football League and he further appeared in all matches for Mohammedan in Kolkata league.

TRAU FC
After Kolkata league, Princewill went back to his former club TRAU FC and signed with them for I-League 2nd Division. In 2018–19 season in 2nd division I-League, Princewill formed a formidable partnership with Nigerian teammate Joseph Olaleye and TRAU managed to secure top spot with a promotion to I-League. Princewill was the top scorer in 2018–19 season with 10 goals on his name.

In 2019–20 season with TRAU FC, Princewill got captain's armband for the entire season of I-League.

Career statistics

Club

Honours 
TRAU
I-League 2nd Division: 2018–19

References 

Living people
Association football forwards
TRAU FC players
Nigerian expatriate footballers
1992 births
Nigerian footballers
I-League players
I-League 2nd Division players
Nigerian expatriate sportspeople in India
Expatriate footballers in India
People from Owerri
Sportspeople from Imo State